Ralph P. Locke (born 1949) is an American musicologist, classical music critic and professor emeritus of musicology at Eastman School of Music. He founded the Eastman Studies in Music series. He is a contributor to the New Grove Dictionary of Music and several other books, and has been editor of several journals. He is also "one of the most published musicologists on orientalism and music." Locke earned his BA at Harvard University and his PhD at the University of Chicago.

Selected bibliography
Music and the Exotic from the Renaissance to Mozart, Cambridge University Press, 2015
Musical Exoticism: Images and Reflections, Cambridge University Press, 2009
Cultivating Music in America: Women Patrons and Activists since 1860, University of California Press, 1997
Music, Musicians, and the Saint-Simonians, University of Chicago Press, 1986

References

American musicologists
Eastman School of Music faculty
1949 births
Harvard University alumni
University of Chicago alumni
Living people